GRUR International - Journal of European and International IP Law  (formerly Gewerblicher Rechtsschutz und Urheberrecht, Internationaler Teil) is a monthly journal co-published in English by Verlag C.H. Beck and Oxford University Press. Founded in 1952 and owned by the German Association for the Protection of Intellectual Property (GRUR), since 1967 the Max Planck Institute for Innovation and Competition has assumed the scientific direction of the journal. Originally published in the German language, GRUR International made the transition to English in 2020.

The journal covers worldwide developments in intellectual property and competition law. In addition to scientific articles, the journal also publishes decisions and leading cases from jurisdictions around the world, as well as editorials, opinions, reports, case notes, official statements and book reviews. The editors-in-chief are Reto M. Hilty and Josef Drexl (Max Planck Institute for Innovation and Competition). The total annual volume amounts to approximately 1,200 printed pages.

See also 
 List of intellectual property law journals
 Gewerblicher Rechtsschutz und Urheberrecht (GRUR)
 Gewerblicher Rechtsschutz und Urheberrecht, Rechtsprechungs-Report (GRUR RR)

References

External links 
 (in English) Web page on Oxford University Press web site
 Web page on Verlag C.H. Beck web site
  Web page on Max Planck Institute for Intellectual Property, Competition and Tax Law web site

1952 establishments in West Germany
German intellectual property law
German-language magazines
Monthly magazines published in Germany
Intellectual property law magazines
International law journals
Magazines established in 1952
Magazines published in Munich